The 1992 NBA Finals was the championship round of the 1991–92 NBA season, and the conclusion of the season's playoffs. The defending NBA champion and Eastern Conference champion Chicago Bulls took on the Western Conference champion Portland Trail Blazers for the title, with Chicago having home court advantage, as they had the best record in the NBA that season.

The two teams appeared headed to face each other for most of the season and comparisons were made between Clyde Drexler and Michael Jordan throughout the season. A month earlier Sports Illustrated had even listed Drexler as Jordan's "No. 1 rival" on a cover the two appeared on together before the playoffs. The media, hoping to recreate a Magic Johnson–Larry Bird type rivalry in Jordan-Drexler, compared the two throughout the pre-Finals hype.

The Bulls went on to win the series in six games, becoming the fourth NBA team to win back-to-back championships after the Boston Celtics, Los Angeles Lakers, and Detroit Pistons. Michael Jordan was named Finals Most Valuable Player for the second year in a row, to go with his sixth straight regular season scoring title.

Background

Chicago Bulls

The Bulls won their first NBA championship the previous season, ushering in a new era in the league. Proving that their maiden championship was no fluke, the Bulls continued their dominance in the 1991–92 season, finishing with a 67–15 record, surpassing last season's record by six games. Jordan won his second consecutive MVP award with a 30.1 points/6.4 assists/6.1 rebounds season.

After easily sweeping the Miami Heat in the opening round, they encountered the New York Knicks, who were now coached by Pat Riley. The Knicks' hard-nosed style of play soon took its toll on the Bulls, but led by Jordan, they escaped in seven games. Up next were the Cleveland Cavaliers in the conference finals, whom the Bulls had beaten in two prior postseason meetings. Despite facing a much-improved Cavaliers team, the Bulls were still too much to handle, and they won in six games.

With their co-tenants at Chicago Stadium, the Blackhawks, coached by Mike Keenan and captained by Dirk Graham, playing in the Stanley Cup Finals, it was an opportunity for both the Bulls and the Blackhawks to help the city of Chicago become the first city to have both NBA and NHL championships in the same year; unfortunately it was not to be, as the Blackhawks were swept at the hands of the Pittsburgh Penguins.

Portland Trail Blazers

The previous season, Portland was coming off a 1989-90 NBA Finals loss to the Detroit Pistons. The 1990-91 Trail Blazers won a franchise record 63 games, and, as the top seed in the Western Conference, appeared destined to meet the Bulls for the championship. However, the Los Angeles Lakers upended the narrative, defeating Portland in six games of the conference final. However, the Lakers would lose to the Chicago Bulls in the finals. Of note, the upset marked a final hurrah for the "Showtime"-era Lakers, as Kareem Abdul-Jabbar had retired two years prior, and Magic Johnson would retire unexpectedly in the first week of the 1992-93 season, after learning he had tested positive for HIV.

For the 1991-91 season, the Blazers retained the same core from the previous two seasons; the team won the Pacific Division title with a 57–25 record. In the first round of the playoffs, they avenged the previous year's loss, dispatching a weakened Lakers team, 3–1. Portland followed that up with a five-game defeat of the Phoenix Suns in the second round, before booking another trip to the finals with a six-game elimination of the Utah Jazz in the conference finals.

The 1992 NBA Finals cemented the reputations of both Michael Jordan and Clyde Drexler (placing the latter firmly in the former's shadow).

Road to the Finals

Regular season series
The Chicago Bulls won both games in the regular season series:

Team rosters

Chicago Bulls

Portland Trail Blazers

Series summary

Game 1

Michael Jordan dominated from the beginning, breaking the record for most points in a first half in the playoffs once held by Elgin Baylor (Michael had 35, Baylor had 33). This included six first-half threes (also a record). It was after the sixth three-pointer that Jordan turned towards the broadcast table and famously shrugged to indicate his surprise. Jordan's shrug became a highlight reel mainstay. Portland held their final lead at 45–44 in the second quarter before Chicago went on a 22–6 run to grab a 66–51 halftime lead and take control. The Bulls finished with a 122–89 win over the Portland Trail Blazers.

Game 2

With the Blackhawks playing for the Stanley Cup when the Bulls reached the Finals, Game 2 would have had conflict with Game 6 of the Blackhawks' series, as both teams would have played on the same day at Chicago Stadium. However, the Blackhawks series ended in 4 games, so no rescheduling was needed.

Portland built an eight-point lead in the first quarter, and held a nine-point lead at the half. However, as in Game 1, their lead started to disappear as the Bulls made their run – Jordan scored 14 points while Paxson scored 9, taking a seven-point lead by the end of the third quarter. Chicago was looking to take a commanding 2–0 lead in the series when Clyde Drexler fouled out with 4:36 remaining. With the Bulls up by 10, Jordan started to lose his poise, committing a foul and then a technical foul. This helped Portland build a 15–5 run, pushing the game into overtime after Jordan narrowly missed at the buzzer. In overtime, Portland dominated, especially Ainge, who scored six points with one minute remaining as the Blazers won 115–104 – the Bulls' worst home defeat in an NBA Finals game.

Game 3

Chicago had lost home court advantage, but dominated Portland, holding them to numerous franchise playoff lows: 84 points in a game, 39 second-half points and 28 field goals. Chicago would go on a 30–13 run in the first half to gain a 44–30 lead which Portland would cut to three with 7:09 left in the third before the Bulls went to another 12–3 run. Portland would then go on a field goal drought, not scoring from the 4:33 mark in the third quarter until the 9:36 mark of the fourth, a 6:57 stretch.

Game 4

Portland was still playing as they were during Game 3, not scoring for four minutes and finding themselves down 10–0. The Bulls were up 22–9 before the Blazers rallied and cut the deficit to three at the half, but found themselves down again in the third quarter. While Jordan scored 13 points in the third quarter, he would not score in the game's final 10:26. Portland went on a 15–6 run to even the series at two games apiece.

Game 5

The Bulls jumped out to a 10–2 lead and never looked back, answering every Blazers comeback attempt with a run of their own. Chicago opened the second half on a 16–8 run to give the Bulls a 20-point lead. Portland didn't pull back within single digits until less than four minutes were left in the game, and ended up losing 119–106.

Michael Jordan, who briefly sat with a bad ankle, finished with 46 points on 14-of-23 from the field and 16-of-19 from the line. Scottie Pippen fell just short of a triple-double, with 24 points, 11 rebounds and nine assists. Clyde Drexler scored 30 points to lead six Portland players in double figures. However, Portland had 18 turnovers and shot just 43.8 percent from the field, compared to 54.8 percent for the Bulls.

Game 6

Portland started strongly as they held Michael Jordan scoreless for the game's first 11 minutes, and took a 43–28 lead midway through the second quarter before Chicago went on a 16–7 run and cut the deficit to only six points. Portland also dominated the third quarter, building a 79–64 lead. Phil Jackson went with four reserves and Scottie Pippen to start the fourth quarter, cutting Portland's lead to three after only three minutes. Jordan returned and had two steals and converted them to hoops to give Chicago a permanent lead. The Bulls' defense held Portland to only six points in the final four minutes, leading the Bulls to their second straight championship. Jordan finished with 33 points and was named Finals MVP for the second consecutive year.

Player statistics

Chicago Bulls

|-
| align="left" |  || 6 || 0 || 17.8 || .429 || .250 || .571 || 0.8 || 2.3 || 0.3 || 0.0 || 5.8 
|-
| align="left" |  || 6 || 6 || 25.2 || .500 || .000 || .500 || 4.0 || 1.5 || 0.5 || 0.2 || 6.3 
|-
| align="left" |  || 6 || 6 || 37.8 || .561 || .000 || .529 || 7.8 || 4.0 || 0.8 || 2.3 || 9.2 
|-
| align="left" |  || 5 || 0 || 8.0 || .600 || .750 || .500 || 0.4 || 0.6 || 0.2 || 0.0 || 3.2 
|-
| align="left" |  || 2 || 0 || 3.0 || 1.000 || .000 || .000 || 0.0 || 0.0 || 0.5 || 0.0 || 1.0 
|-! style="background:#FDE910;"
| align="left" |  || 6 || 6 || 42.3 || .526 || .429 || .891 || 4.8 || 6.5 || 1.7 || 0.3 || 35.8 
|-
| align="left" |  || 4 || 0 || 12.0 || .333 || .000 || .667 || 2.5 || 0.0 || 0.3 || 0.3 || 4.5 
|-
| align="left" |  || 6 || 0 || 10.8 || .450 || .000 || .500 || 2.2 || 0.7 || 0.2 || 0.2 || 3.8 
|-
| align="left" |  || 6 || 6 || 30.8 || .520 || .389 || .750 || 0.8 || 2.7 || 1.3 || 0.0 || 10.3 
|-
| align="left" |  || 3 || 0 || 3.3 || .333 || .000 || .000 || 1.0 || 0.0 || 0.0 || 0.0 || 0.7 
|-
| align="left" |  || 6 || 6 || 40.7 || .484 || .222 || .786 || 8.3 || 7.7 || 1.5 || 0.7 || 20.8 
|-
| align="left" |  || 6 || 0 || 21.3 || .542 || .000 || .778 || 6.2 || 1.0 || 0.2 || 1.3 || 5.5

Portland Trail Blazers

|-
| align="left" |  || 1 || 0 || 6.0 || .000 || .000 || .500 || 2.0 || 0.0 || 0.0 || 0.0 || 1.0 
|-
| align="left" |  || 6 || 0 || 23.0 || .434 || .235 || .714 || 2.0 || 2.5 || 0.8 || 0.2 || 10.0 
|-
| align="left" |  || 1 || 0 || 21.0 || .625 || .000 || .000 || 5.0 || 0.0 || 0.0 || 0.0 || 10.0 
|-
| align="left" |  || 1 || 0 || 8.0 || .000 || .000 || .000 || 2.0 || 0.0 || 0.0 || 2.0 || 0.0
|-
| align="left" |  || 6 || 6 || 39.7 || .407 || .150 || .893 || 7.8 || 5.3 || 1.3 || 1.0 || 24.8 
|-
| align="left" |  || 6 || 6 || 27.3 || .431 || .000 || .706 || 6.8 || 1.5 || 0.5 || 0.7 || 9.3 
|-
| align="left" |  || 6 || 6 || 38.0 || .481 || .000 || .733 || 8.7 || 3.3 || 1.8 || 0.2 || 14.8 
|-
| align="left" |  || 2 || 0 || 8.0 || .167 || .000 || .750 || 0.5 || 0.5 || 0.5 || 0.0 || 2.5 
|-
| align="left" |  || 6 || 6 || 43.8 || .471 || .231 || .824 || 4.3 || 4.7 || 1.0 || 0.3 || 16.2 
|-
| align="left" |  || 6 || 0 || 24.3 || .442 || .000 || .593 || 3.0 || 2.2 || 0.8 || 0.7 || 10.3 
|-
| align="left" |  || 5 || 0 || 5.2 || .286 || .000 || .000 || 0.2 || 0.2 || 0.6 || 0.0 || 0.8 
|-
| align="left" |  || 6 || 6 || 35.2 || .500 || .000 || .938 || 7.3 || 1.0 || 0.8 || 0.5 || 7.8

Media coverage
NBC Sports used commentator Marv Albert, analysts Mike Fratello and Magic Johnson, and sideline reporter Ahmad Rashad (both teams' sidelines). Bob Costas and Quinn Buckner hosted the pre-game, halftime and postgame reports.

Just months later, the 1991–92 NBA season documentary Untouchabulls was released. Narrated by Hal Douglas, it recaps the Bulls' championship season. "Jam" by Michael Jackson was used as the theme song for the documentary. That same year, Jordan was featured in Jackson's music video for "Jam".

Aftermath
The Bulls won their third straight championship in the  season, winning 57 games and defeating the Phoenix Suns in the 1993 NBA Finals. In the offseason that preceded Michael Jordan and Scottie Pippen played for the Dream Team that won the gold medal in the Barcelona Olympics, making them the first players to win NBA championship and Olympic gold medal in the same year (Pippen would achieve this feat again in 1996). That team also included Blazers guard Clyde Drexler. This made Jordan, Patrick Ewing of the New York Knicks and Chris Mullin of the Golden State Warriors the only players to have won Olympic gold medals as both amateurs and professionals, having played for Team USA in Los Angeles.

The 1992 Finals would prove the Blazers' last Finals appearance . In the next three seasons, the Blazers rebuilt the team, hiring general manager Bob Whitsitt in 1994 and lost the core of their 1992 Finals team to free agency and trades, beginning with Kevin Duckworth's departure to the Bullets in the 1993 offseason.

The 1991–92 Bulls, along with the 1995–96 Bulls, were named one of the 10 greatest teams in NBA history during the league's golden anniversary.

The 1992 championship marked the only time the Bulls celebrated their title at the Chicago Stadium. Following the awarding ceremony by commissioner David Stern, they returned to the court to show their newly-won title in front of Bulls fans.

Notes and references

External links
NBA History
1992 NBA Finals at Basketball Reference

National Basketball Association Finals
Finals
NBA
NBA
Basketball competitions in Portland, Oregon
1992 in sports in Illinois
1992 in sports in Oregon
1990s in Chicago
1992 in Illinois
1992 in Portland, Oregon
June 1992 sports events in the United States
Basketball competitions in Chicago
GMA Network television specials